The  is a river in Yamanashi and Shizuoka Prefectures of central Japan. With the Mogami River and the Kuma River, it is regarded as one of the three most rapid flows of Japan.

There it changes its name to the Fuji River. It then flows around the west foot of Mount Fuji and into Suruga Bay at its mouth in the city of Fuji.

The banks of the Fuji River was the location of the Battle of Fujikawa in 1180, one of the most important early battles of the Genpei War. The Sengoku period warlord Takeda Shingen built extensive dikes along the Kamanashi portion of the river, which allowed water to flood buffer zones to control damage. Flood control efforts continued under the Tokugawa shogunate of the Edo period, when extensive dikes were completed in 1674 after 50 years of construction, to divert the lower river away from populated areas, which were prone to flooding.

Water transportation up the river from Suruga Bay to inland Kai Province prospered in the Edo period and early Meiji period, until the opening of the Tōkaidō Main Line, Chūō Main Line and Fuji Minobu Railway railways. Commercial river transport ceased in 1923.

There are numerous dams for hydroelectric power generation and flood control along the various tributaries in the upper reaches of the river. The Fuji River also marks the divide of Japan's electrical grid, with the utility frequency of 50 hertz to the east, and 60 hertz to the west.

The view of the Tōkaidō Shinkansen train crossing the river against the background of Mount Fuji is a celebrated scene representative of Japan.

References

 (mouth)

Rivers of Nagano Prefecture
Rivers of Shizuoka Prefecture
Rivers of Yamanashi Prefecture
Akaishi Mountains
Minami Alps National Park
Rivers of Japan